Kalisz Pomorski  (formerly ) is a small town in Drawsko County in West Pomeranian Voivodeship in northwestern Poland with about 4,500 inhabitants.

History
In the 8th century a Slavic gród existed in present-day Kalisz Pomorski. In the Middle Ages it was part of Poland, located in northern Greater Poland. The town's name derives from the city of Kalisz in southern Greater Poland. In order to develop this sparsely populated area, duke Przemysł I brought settlers from Kalisz to the settlement, which was newly named in Latin Nova Calisia (meaning New Kalisz).

It was part of the Kingdom of Prussia from the 18th century and between 1871 and 1945 it was part of Germany. During World War II, in 1944–1945, the Germans operated a subcamp of the Ravensbrück concentration camp in the town, in which they imprisoned around 500–1,000 people at a time. After the defeat of Nazi Germany in World War II, the town became part of Poland again.

Gallery

Notable residents
 Paul Sydow (1851 – 1925), German mycologist and lichenologist

International relations

Twin towns — Sister cities
Kalisz Pomorski is twinned with:
 Kaltenkirchen, Germany
 Torgelow, Germany
 Putlitz, Germany

References

External links

 http://www.kaliszpom.pl/

Cities and towns in West Pomeranian Voivodeship
Drawsko County